Everywhere at Once may refer to:

 Everywhere at Once (The Plimsouls album), a 1983 album by The Plimsouls
 Everywhere at Once (Lyrics Born album), a 2008 album by Lyrics Born
 Everywhere at Once, a 2013 album by Paul Allen and the Underthinkers
 Everywhere at Once, a 2017 mixtape by Bobby Creekwater